Mary, Lady Impey (2 March 1749 – 20 February 1818) was an English natural historian and patron of the arts in Bengal. The wife of Sir Elijah Impey, the Chief Justice of Bengal, she established a menagerie in Calcutta and commissioned Indian artists to paint the various creatures.

Biography

Born Mary Reade in Oxfordshire, she was the eldest of the three children of Sir John Reade, 5th Baronet, of Shipton Court, and his wife Harriet. On 18 January 1768, at Hammersmith parish church (Fulham North Side) then just outside London, she married a thirty-six-year-old barrister, Elijah Impey, and over the next five years bore him four children. In 1773, Elijah Impey was made chief justice of Fort William in Bengal and the couple moved to India, leaving the children with their father's brother in Hammersmith. In 1775, having settled in Fort William, Impey started a collection of native birds and animals on the extensive gardens of the estate, which had formerly been that of Henry Vansittart, governor of Bengal from 1760 to 1764.

Paintings

Beginning in 1777, Impey and her husband hired local artists to paint birds, animals and native plants, life-sized where possible, and in natural surrounds.  The collection, often known as the Impey Album, is an important example of Company style painting. She also kept extensive notes about habitat and behaviour which were of use to later biologists.  The three artists who are known were Sheikh Zain al-Din, Bhavani Das, and Ram Das. More than half of the over 300 paintings made were of birds. The collection was dispersed in an auction in 1810.

Family

Between 1775 and 1783, Impey bore four more children, three of whom survived to return with them to England when her husband was impeached.  She bore one more child back in England. Her husband died in 1809 and she died in 1818 at Newick Park, near Lewes, East Sussex, and both were buried in a family vault at St Paul's, Hammersmith, London. They are commemorated in the church with a wall monument by Peter Rouw.

The Himalayan monal (Lophophorus impejanus) was named 'Impeyan pheasant' in her honour. A portrait of her by Thomas Gainsborough sold for 2,800 guineas (£2,940) at a Christies auction in 1904. The portrait is now in Furman University.

Notes

References

External links

Exhibition of "Lady Impey’s Indian Bird Paintings" at the Ashmolean Museum, Oxford (until 14th Apr 2013) 
"Memoirs of Sir Elijah Impey: Knt., First Chief Justice of the Supreme Court of Judicature, at Fort William, Bengal; with Anecdotes of Warren Hastings, Sir Philip Francis, Nathaniel Brassey Halhed, Esq., and Other Contemporaries; Comp. from Authentic Documents, in Refutation of the Calumnies of the Right Hon. Thomas Babington Macaulay" (Google eBook), Simpkin, Marshall, and Company, 1846

1749 births
1818 deaths
English natural history collectors
English ornithologists
People from Oxfordshire (before 1974)
English art collectors
Women art collectors
Wives of knights